Speaker of the House of Assembly of Barbados is the presiding officer of House of Assembly of Barbados.

Below is a list of office-holders:

Notes

Sources 
  Official website of the Parliament of Barbados
 Speakers of the House of Assembly

See also
Speaker (politics)

Government of Barbados
Politics of Barbados

Barbados
Parliament of Barbados